Sergei Viktorovich Kudryavtsev (born 26 November 1980) is a former Russian professional footballer.

External links
 

1980 births
Living people
Russian footballers
Association football forwards
FC Mordovia Saransk players
FC Lokomotiv Nizhny Novgorod players
FC Slavia Mozyr players
FC Znamya Truda Orekhovo-Zuyevo players
Belarusian Premier League players
Russian expatriate footballers
Expatriate footballers in Belarus
FC Torpedo Vladimir players